Pável Pardo Segura (born 26 July 1976) is a Mexican former professional footballer who played as a defensive midfielder.

Pardo spent most of his career playing with Club América and is the fourth most capped player in the history of the Mexico national football team. Pardo participated in two World Cups (1998 and 2006), won two CONCACAF Gold Cups and won the FIFA Confederations Cup with Mexico in 1999.

Club career
Pardo started his football career in 1993 with Atlas de Guadalajara, and later played with Tecos UAG before joining Club América. He is regarded as one of the best players in Mexico since the 1990s, having achieved great success with Club América, where he won the Mexican Torneo de Verano 2002, Torneo de Clausura in 2005 and the CONCACAF Champions Cup tournament in 2006.

After participating with Mexico in high-profile tournaments, namely the 2005 FIFA Confederations Cup and the 2006 FIFA World Cup, both of which were held in Germany, Pardo began to attract attention from a number of international clubs. Rumors linked him with River Plate of Argentina and Recreativo Huelva of Spain, however Pardo was unable to reach an agreement with either club.

Following the World Cup, Pardo joined VfB Stuttgart, for a sum of €1 million, the same club that purchased Pardo's national teammate, Ricardo Osorio. Pardo scored his first goal for Stuttgart in a 16 September 2006 league contest and win against Werder Bremen.

On 19 May 2007, Stuttgart won the Bundesliga with Pardo, who appeared in 33 complete games, serving as one of the pillars of the team. He was voted the fifth-best player in his first season in Germany. In the 2007–08 season, his second year at Stuttgart, he established himself as one of the leading players, due to his constant and solid performances and also because, at 32, he was one of the older players in the otherwise young VfB side. Therefore, he earned the nickname el comandante or el jefe in the team.

In January 2009, he returned to Club América for a fee of US $600,000.

In July 2011, Pardo revealed he would be signing with a Major League Soccer team after América allowed him to terminate his contract with them and thus sign on a free transfer with MLS, and signed with the Chicago Fire on 26 July 2011. Pardo re-signed with Chicago for the 2012 season on 18 January 2012.

On 19 January 2013, Pardo announced his retirement from football.

International career
Pardo made his international debut for Mexico in 1996, playing in the U.S. Cup tournament, against the USA. Since then, Pardo has captained his country in several occasions and played important roles for the national team for many years, helping his country to winning the 1998 and 2003 CONCACAF Gold Cup tournaments and the 1999 FIFA Confederations Cup. He played in France 98, as well as the 1997 Copa América and 1999 and the mentioned 2005 Confederations Cup and 2006 World Cup.

At the 1998 World Cup, Pardo was sent off in the match between Belgium and Mexico. Referee Hugh Dallas was criticised for his actions during the game after he also sent off Gert Verheyen.

On 21 June 2007, he played in the 2007 Gold Cup, helping Mexico earn second place. The day after the game he announced that he would not go to 2007 Copa América because he needed some rest. The national side eventually ended up in third place in that tournament.

On 20 August 2008, he helped Mexico to a 2–1 win over Honduras at home in their first World Cup qualifier match at Estadio Azteca, scoring a brace in the 72nd and 75th minute respectively after trailing 1–0.

He was called up to play again against Honduras after missing the squad due to injury or call-ups from VfB Stuttgart.

Player profile
Pardo was a well-rounded defensive player. He started playing as a right back, but he could double as a left back, and was also often deployed in the defensive midfield position, especially later in his career. He was often his team's designated set piece taker, as he was an excellent crosser. Many of his goals came from free kicks (either direct shots or undeflected inswinging crosses) and penalties. A leader on the field, he often served as captain for the teams he played for.

Career statistics

Club

International

Scores and results list Mexico's goal tally first, score column indicates score after each Pardo goal.

Honours
América
Mexican Primera División: Verano 2002, Clausura 2005
Campeón de Campeones: 2005
CONCACAF Champions Cup: 2006

VfB Stuttgart
Bundesliga: 2006–07

Mexico
FIFA Confederations Cup: 1999
CONCACAF Gold Cup: 1998, 2003

Individual
Mexican Primera División Full-back of the Tournament: 1996–97, Invierno 1997
Mexican Primera División Defensive Midfielder of the Tournament: Clausura 2003, 2004–05, Apertura 2005
Mexican Primera División Special Recognition Award: Clausura 2007
CONCACAF Gold Cup All-Tournament Team: 2007

See also 
 List of men's footballers with 100 or more international caps

References

External links
 
 
 
 

Living people
1976 births
Mexican footballers
Association football midfielders
Association football defenders
Association football fullbacks
Mexico international footballers
FIFA Century Club
Atlas F.C. footballers
VfB Stuttgart players
Club América footballers
Tecos F.C. footballers
Chicago Fire FC players
Liga MX players
Bundesliga players
Major League Soccer players
2007 CONCACAF Gold Cup players
2003 CONCACAF Gold Cup players
1998 CONCACAF Gold Cup players
2006 FIFA World Cup players
1998 FIFA World Cup players
2005 FIFA Confederations Cup players
1999 FIFA Confederations Cup players
1997 FIFA Confederations Cup players
1997 Copa América players
1999 Copa América players
2004 Copa América players
CONCACAF Gold Cup-winning players
FIFA Confederations Cup-winning players
Footballers at the 1996 Summer Olympics
Olympic footballers of Mexico
Footballers from Guadalajara, Jalisco
Mexican expatriate footballers
Mexican expatriate sportspeople in Germany
Expatriate footballers in Germany
Mexican expatriate sportspeople in the United States
Expatriate soccer players in the United States
Pan American Games medalists in football
Pan American Games silver medalists for Mexico
Medalists at the 1995 Pan American Games
Footballers at the 1995 Pan American Games